Jean-Pierre Feydeau (30 April 1903 - 17 Septembre 1970) was a French film director and screenwriter. Son of dramatist and playwright Georges Feydeau, he was also uncle of Alain Feydeau, Alain Terrane and Jacques Terrane.

Filmography

Assistant director 
1934 : Liliom by Fritz Lang

Director 
1942 : L'Amant de Bornéo codirected with René Le Hénaff

Screenwriter 
1934 : Le Coup de parapluie by Victor de Fast
1934 : Deux mille deux cent vingt deux CF2 by Victor de Fast
1935 : Les yeux noirs by Viktor Tourjansky
1936 : Wells in Flames by Viktor Tourjansky
1936 : Monsieur est saisi by René Sti
1936 : La Peur by Viktor Tourjansky after the novel by Stefan Zweig
1938 : Mon curé chez les riches by Jean Boyer 
1939 : Extenuating Circumstances by Jean Boyer
1942 : La Symphonie fantastique by Christian-Jaque
1946 : Destins by Richard Pottier
1946 : Rooster Heart by Maurice Cloche
1948 : Route sans issue by Jean Stelli
1951 : Andalousie by Robert Vernay
1951 : The Dream of Andalusia by Luis Lucia
1952 : Une fille sur la route by Jean Stelli
1952 : Mon curé chez les riches by Henri Diamant-Berger
1953 : The Beauty of Cadiz by Raymond Bernard and Eusebio Fernández Ardavín
1957 : Fernand clochard by Pierre Chevalier
1960  : Bouche cousue by Jean Boyer

References

External links 

Fiche dvdtoile

1903 births
1970 deaths
20th-century French screenwriters
Film directors from Paris